Xialiang station, is a station of Line 14 of the Guangzhou Metro. It started operations on 28 December 2018.

The station has an underground island platform. Platform 1 is for trains heading to Dongfeng, whilst platform 2 is for trains heading to Jiahewanggang.

Exits
There are 3 exits, lettered B, C and D. Exit C is accessible. All exits are located on Longhe West Road.

Gallery

References

 Railway stations in China opened in 2018
 Guangzhou Metro stations in Baiyun District